YKI may be:

YKI test
Institute for Surface Chemistry
 Yorkie (Yki), a protein kinase involved in the Hippo signaling pathway, a signaling pathway in cell regulation